Frank Papenbroock (born 1963) is a German documentary filmmaker, film director and author. His documentary films cover a variety of topics in areas such as culture & arts, history, science, religion or reportage.

Career 
Papenbroock started his professional career as assistant photographer to renowned German photographer Christian von Alvensleben  and acclaimed New York photographer and later commercial director Michael Somoroff. For a brief period Papenbroock himself worked as a photographer and then moved to New York City, to study film at the Tisch School of the Arts (New York University). At the same time he managed a commercial production studio in Manhattan, later becoming freelance camera assistant to top D.O.P.s like Howard Atherton, Allen Daviau, Ernest Day, Robert Fraisse or Geoffrey Wharton and then eventually began his own work as director/cameraman.

In the early 1990s he returned to his hometown Hamburg and soon began working as a documentary filmmaker and specialist for contemporary literature, for the cultural broadcast division of the NDR, shooting 18 episodes about leading authors like Paul Auster or Joseph Heller for the preeminent literary program "Bücherjournal" ("Book Journal").

From 1994 onwards, he has been partner and creative managing director of blm Filmproduction , shooting numerous commercials, corporate films, "special format" films (i.e. multi-screen pictures and 360°-dome-films) as well as music videos.

In 2006 his German/French documentary "Genesis vs. Darwin" ("Von Göttern und Designern") about creationism  in Europe, caused a public uproar which eventually led to the resignation of then cultural minister Karin Wolf. The insights of the investigative film became part of the protocol of the European parliament's report on creationism in 2007

Author
Papenbroock is a renowned author for TV-documentary programs like "Terra X", "Hitec " or "Menschen hautnah".

Commercials
Papenbroock's career includes hundreds of commercials for major European companies like: Autostadt, Beiersdorf, Deutsche Bahn, Nestlé or Tchibo,

Documentaries (selected)

Music videos
Papenbroock also has directed several music videos, for artists like Mark Wahlberg, Vangelis,
Sarah Brightman .

External links

Frank Papenbroock's production company
C.V.

German Wikipedia entry

References

1963 births
Living people
Mass media people from Hamburg
German documentary filmmakers